Mai Hồng Ngọc (born 13 October 1988), better known by her stage name Đông Nhi, is a Vietnamese singer. She studied at the Marie Curie High School in Ho Chi Minh City. Her first projects, such as The First Step (2009), The Singer (2012), Sau Moi Giac Mo (2012), and I Wanna Dance (2013), have won several awards.

During her career, Nhi has won various awards; she was awarded Favorite Female Singer at the Zing Music Awards six times in a row from 2011 to 2016, Ballad Female Singer at the Golden Apricot Blossom Awards three times in a row, Asia's Best Vietnamese Singer from MAMA, South East Asia's Best Singer at the 2016 MTV EMAs, and nominated twice at the Cong Hien Awards. Other recognition includes the Big Apple Music Awards (BAMA) and the Vietnam Labor Bureau for her devotion.

Nhi won the first season of The Remix in 2015, and was the coach of The Voice Kids of Vietnam in 2016 and The Voice Vietnam in 2017. She has been part of marketing campaigns with Sunsilk, Samsung, Maybelline, Audi Vietnam, Nescafe, Pepsi, KFC, Nokia X, and others.

Life and career

1988–2007: Early life and career beginning 
Mai Hồng Ngọc was born in Hanoi, but her family moved to Ho Chi Minh City when she was two years old. Nhi developed her music ability at a young age, and won many awards in high school. Nhi enrolled at Ho Chi Minh National University, but left to pursue her music career. She failed at many singing contests such as Vietnam Idol, but was officially signed to be a singer for a recording company, NewGen. Teen pop was popular at that time; her songs "Chang Baby Milo" and "Du quay tinh yeu" became hits and were requested numerous times on the radio. However, NewGen assumed her strong image wasn't suitable for the current trend; instead, they supported Khổng Tú Quỳnh, whose image was more trendy. Nhi was dropped after a few months.

2008–2011: First singles and success 
In 2008, Nhi independently released her first single, "Khóc" (Cry). The song became a minor hit, which helped her to gain some recognition and get signed to Tinu Production Company. She began to make teen-pop songs, which gave her more recognition. She also starred in a few movies and films such as Giải cứu thần chết, Thứ ba học trò, and Công chúa teen và ngũ hổ tướng.

Nhi announced her hiatus in 2009. During her hiatus, it was rumored that she was pregnant, but she said it was only a rumor. She came back with her official debut album, The First Step, which won the Favorite Album Award at the HTV Awards. The album also reached the top 10 at the Zing Music Awards. The same year, her song "Từng Thuộc Về Nhau" became a big hit and received positive reviews.

In September 2011, Nhi released her EP The Singer, a collaboration with many Vietnamese popular musicians. She won Best Female Singer at the Zing Music Awards, and The Singer was ranked in the Top 10 Album of the Year.

2012–2013: Getting more public recognition 
In early 2012, she voiced over in The Lorax with TV host Thanh Bach. At the end of April, Nhi debuted her music video for "Sau Mỗi Giấc Mơ", in which 80% of scenes were underwater. The song and music video topped many Vietnamese music charts; subsequently, Nhi won Favorite Female Singer at the Zing Music Awards. At the end of 2012, she held a mini concert with the Bo tu hoan hao cast. In 2013, her MV for "Tìm Về" was the first in Vietnam that featured 3D scenes and technology.

In early 2013, she hosted Dancing with the Stars. She also stopped working with her manager Dang Phuong and signed with Ong Cao Thang's 6th Sense Entertainment. Due to her changed image, she had a breakthrough with EDM. Along with this success, she still gained successes for her pop songs, namely "Tim Về" and "Xoa". She won several awards and started to build a fanbase; she sponsored many brands.

2014–2015: I Wanna Dance and The Remix 
In 2014, Nhi released her second album I Wanna Dance, featuring pop-electronic songs. The album's lead single, "I Wanna Dance", topped many music charts in Vietnam, as well as Chinese and Spanish charts. The song won Favorite Pop - Electronic Song at the Zing Music Awards 2014. Nhi also won Favorite Female Singer for the fourth time. At the 19th Golden Apricot Blossom Awards, she won Favorite Ballad Singer. In September, she was confirmed to be a judge on Vo Chong Minh Hat.

On March 28, 2015, she was the official judge of the Toa Sang Tai Nang Chau A contest, along with Midu and Lam Vinh Ha. On April 5, 2015, Nhi won Favorite Female Singer at the HTV Awards.

In early February, at the 20th Golden Apricot Blossom Awards, she won Favorite Ballad Singer. In early 2015, she competed in the first season of The Remix, which she won on May 3. Here, she also performed her single "Stop Loving You", which immediately topped many music charts.

On May 15, she released the music video for "Vi Ai Vi Anh". The video received more than one million views and topped the Zing MP3 chart upon release. The song won Music Video of the Year at the Zing Music Awards 2015, at which Nhi won Favorite Singer for the fifth time. "Vi Ai Vi Anh" won Best Song Award at the Yan Vpop Awards 2015.

On May 16, she was a judge on Ngoi Sao Phuong Nam. On May 31, 2015, she came back to Vietnam Idol as a guest, in which she performed "Hot" at the first night gala.

On December 2, Nhi became the youngest Vietnamese singer to win a Mnet Asian Music Award. On December 14, she released the music video for "Boom Boom".

2016–17: The Voice Kids, first live show, and The Voice of Vietnam 
On January 22, 2016, at the 21st Golden Apricot Blossom Awards, she won Favorite Ballad Female Singer for the third consecutive time and Top 10 Artists of the Year. On January 25, she was enlisted in the 30 Under 30 list by Forbes Vietnam under her real name.

In the fourth season of The Voice Kids of Vietnam, Nhi coached alongside her boyfriend Ông Cao Thắng. On October 2, Nhi had her first live show in eight years, called It's Showtime - Dệt Giấc Mơ Bay. On October 8, Nhi won Best Vietnamese Female Artist from the Big Apple Music Awards 2016. On November 6, 2016, she won Best Asian Artist at the 2016 MTV EMAs.

On January 3, 2017, Nhi was a coach on the fourth season of The Voice of Vietnam, alongside Thu Minh, Tóc Tiên, and Noo Phước Thịnh. During the same month, Nhi won Artist of the Year at the Yan Vpop 20 Awards, as well as Favorite Female Artist at the Zing Music Awards for the sixth time.

On February 2, she released the music video for "Cam On" (We belong together), which was filmed in Japan. Also in February, she released the music video for "Love Me Too", which was sponsored by Samsung. On September 24, she performed "Xin Anh Dung" and "Bad Boy" at the Asia Song Festival 2017. On October 5, she released the music video for "Sao chang the vi em", a ballad song; the video was filmed in Taiwan. Next month, she released the music video for "Co Ba Sai Gon", written by Only C, which became popular among youth.

2018–present: Ten on Ten 
On October 4, 2018, Nhi performed at the 2nd ASEAN - Japan Music Festival 2018, representing Vietnam. She remixed the song "Nụ cười Việt Nam" and performed "Xin lỗi anh quá phiền". For her third studio album, Ten on Ten, Nhi released the music videos for singles "Xin lỗi anh quá phiền", "Giả vờ say" and "Gọi em đi". On December 9, the album was released and topped the Vietnamese iTunes chart.

Personal life
In November 2019, she got married with singer Ông Cao Thắng in an emotional wedding with a great number of public figures. The next year, she gave birth to a girl named Winnie in October.

Public image

Fandom 
On April 19, 2008, Nhi's fanbase was established under the name Potatoes (shortened as Po) which is still active. Her fan club helped her win the BFF contest and become the first Vietnamese singer to own "a star".

Discography

Albums

Extended plays

Singles

As lead artist

As featured artist

References

21st-century Vietnamese women singers
1988 births
Living people
People from Hanoi
People from Ho Chi Minh City
Vietnamese pop singers
Vietnamese idols
MTV Europe Music Award winners